The Bronze Star Medal (BSM) is a United States Armed Forces decoration awarded to members of the United States Armed Forces for either heroic achievement, heroic service, meritorious achievement, or meritorious service in a combat zone.

When the medal is awarded by the Army, Air Force, or Space Force for acts of valor in combat, the "V" device is authorized for wear on the medal.  When the medal is awarded by the Navy, Marine Corps, or Coast Guard for acts of valor or meritorious service in combat, the Combat "V" is authorized for wear on the medal.

Officers from the other Uniformed Services of the United States are eligible to receive this award, as are foreign soldiers who have served with or alongside a service branch of the United States Armed Forces.

Civilians serving with U.S. military forces in combat are also eligible for the award. For example, UPI reporter Joe Galloway was awarded the Bronze Star with "V" device during the Vietnam War for rescuing a badly wounded soldier under fire in the Battle of Ia Drang, in 1965. Another civilian recipient was writer Ernest Hemingway.

General information
The Bronze Star Medal was established by Executive Order 9419, 4 February 1944 (superseded by Executive Order 11046, 24 August 1962, as amended by Executive Order 13286, 28 February 2003).

The Bronze Star Medal may be awarded by the Secretary of a military department or the Secretary of Homeland Security with regard to the Coast Guard when not operating as a service in the Department of the Navy, or by such military commanders, or other appropriate officers as the Secretary concerned may designate, to any person who, while serving in any capacity in or with the Army, Navy, Marine Corps, Air Force, Space Force, or Coast Guard of the United States, after 6 December 1941, distinguishes, or has distinguished, herself or himself by heroic or meritorious achievement or service, not involving participation in aerial flight—
(a) while engaged in an action against an enemy of the United States;
(b) while engaged in military operations involving conflict with an opposing foreign force; or
(c) while serving with friendly foreign forces engaged in an armed conflict against an opposing armed force in which the United States is not a belligerent party.

The acts of heroism are of a lesser degree than required for the award of the Silver Star. The acts of merit or acts of valor must be less than that required for the Legion of Merit but must nevertheless have been meritorious and accomplished with distinction.

The Bronze Star Medal (without the "V" device) may be awarded to each member of the Armed Forces of the United States who, after 6 December 1941, was cited in orders or awarded a certificate for exemplary conduct in ground combat against an armed enemy between 7 December 1941 and 2 September 1945. For this purpose, the US Army's Combat Infantryman Badge or Combat Medical Badge award is considered as a citation in orders. Documents executed since 4 August 1944 in connection with recommendations for the award of decorations of higher degree than the Bronze Star Medal cannot be used as the basis for an award under this paragraph.

Most Filipino and American servicemembers who served in the United States Army Forces in the Far East from 6 December 1941 to 10 May 1942 qualify to be awarded the Bronze Star Medal. They must have served on Luzon, Bataan, or Corregidor at any point within that five-month period in order to qualify.

Effective 11 September 2001, the Meritorious Service Medal may also be bestowed in lieu of the Bronze Star Medal (without Combat "V" device) for meritorious achievement in a designated combat theater.

Appearance
The Bronze Star Medal was designed by Rudolf Freund (1878–1960) of the jewelry firm Bailey, Banks & Biddle. (Freund also designed the Silver Star.)

The medal is a bronze star  in circumscribing diameter. In the center is a  diameter superimposed bronze star, the center line of all rays of both stars coinciding. The reverse bears the inscription "HEROIC OR MERITORIOUS ACHIEVEMENT" with a space for the name of the recipient to be engraved. The star hangs from its ribbon by a rectangular metal loop with rounded corners.

Authorized devices
The Bronze Star Medal with the "V" device to denote heroism is the fourth highest military decoration for valor. Although a service member may be cited for heroism in combat and be awarded more than one Bronze Star authorizing the "V" device, only one "V" may be worn on each suspension and service ribbon of the medal. The following ribbon devices must be specifically authorized in the award citation in order to be worn on the Bronze Star Medal, the criteria for and wear of the devices vary between the services:
 Oak leaf cluster – In the Army, Air Force, and Space Force, the oak leaf cluster is worn to denote additional awards.
 5/16 inch star – In the Navy, Marine Corps, and Coast Guard, the 5/16 inch star is worn to denote additional awards.
 "V" device – In the Army, the "V" is worn solely to denote "participation in acts of heroism involving conflict with an armed enemy."; in the Air Force and Space Force, the "V" is worn to denote heroism in combat.
 Combat "V" – In the Navy, Marine Corps, and Coast Guard, the "V" is worn to denote combat heroism or to recognize individuals who are "exposed to personal hazard during direct participation in combat operations".

History

Colonel Russell P. "Red" Reeder conceived the idea of the Bronze Star Medal in 1943; he believed it would aid morale if captains of companies or of batteries could award a medal to deserving people serving under them. Reeder felt another medal was needed as a ground equivalent of the Air Medal, and suggested calling the proposed new award the "Ground Medal". The idea eventually rose through the military bureaucracy and gained supporters. General George C. Marshall, in a memorandum to President Franklin D. Roosevelt dated 3 February 1944, wrote 

The Air Medal had been adopted two years earlier to raise airmen's morale. President Roosevelt authorized the Bronze Star Medal by Executive Order 9419 dated 4 February 1944, retroactive to 7 December 1941. This authorization was announced in War Department Bulletin No. 3, dated 10 February 1944.

President John F. Kennedy amended Executive Order 9419 per Executive Order 11046 dated 24 August 1962 to expand the authorization to include those serving with friendly forces. This allowed for awards where US service members become involved in an armed conflict where the United States was not a belligerent. At the time of the Executive Order, for example, the US was not a belligerent in Vietnam, so US advisers serving with the Republic of Vietnam Armed Forces would not have been eligible for the award.

Since the award criteria state that the Bronze Star Medal may be awarded to "any person ... while serving in any capacity in or with" the US Armed Forces, awards to members of foreign armed services serving with the United States are permitted. Thus, a number of Allied soldiers received the Bronze Star Medal in World War II, as well as UN soldiers in the Korean War, Vietnamese and allied forces in the Vietnam War, and coalition forces in recent military operations such as the Persian Gulf War, War in Afghanistan, and the Iraq War. A number of Bronze Star Medals with the "V" device were awarded to veterans of the Battle of Mogadishu.

World War II infantry award

As a result of a study conducted in 1947, a policy was implemented that authorized the retroactive award of the Bronze Star Medal (without the "V" device) to all soldiers who had received the Combat Infantryman Badge or the Combat Medical Badge during World War II. The basis for this decision was that these badges were awarded only to soldiers who had borne the hardships which resulted in General Marshall's support of the establishment of the Bronze Star Medal. Both badges required a recommendation by the commander and a citation in orders.

U.S. Air Force criteria controversy
In 2012, two U.S. airmen were allegedly subjected to cyber-bullying after receiving Bronze Star Medals for meritorious non-combat service. The two airmen, who had received the medals in March 2012, had been finance NCOICs in medical units deployed to the War in Afghanistan. The awards sparked a debate as to whether or not the Air Force was awarding too many medals to its members, and whether the Bronze Star should be awarded for non-combat service. This prompted the Air Force to take down stories of the two posted to the internet, and to clarify its criteria for awarding medals. The Air Force contended that meritorious service awards of the Bronze Star outnumber valor awards, and that it views awards on a case-by-case basis to maintain the integrity of the award.

This is not the first time that the USAF has been criticized for offering this award. The Department of Defense investigated the award of the Bronze Star Medal (BSM) by the USAF to some 246 individuals after operations in Kosovo in 1999. All but 60 were awarded to officers, and only 16 of those awarded were actually in the combat zone. At least five were awarded to officers who never left Whiteman Air Force Base in Missouri. During this campaign, the Navy had awarded 69 BSMs, and the Army with 5,000 troops in neighboring Albania (considered part of the combat zone) awarded none. In the end, there was a Pentagon review and decision by Congress in 2001 to stop the awarding of Bronze Stars to personnel outside the combat zone.

Notable recipients

Joe Medicine Crow, Crow War Chief and historian
Julius Ochs Adler, publisher and journalist
Eddie Albert, actor
James Arness, actor
Robert H. Barrow, 27th Commandant of the Marine Corps
Eben Bartlett, member of the New Hampshire House of Representatives
Rocky Bleier, NFL football player
Rudy Boesch, contestant on Survivor: Borneo and Survivor All Stars
Russell Adam Burnham, U.S. Army Soldier of the Year in 2003
Hugh Carey, Governor of New York State
Leonard F. Chapman Jr., 24th Commandant of the Marine Corps
Joseph S. Clark Jr., Mayor of Philadelphia, Pennsylvania
Erastus Corning 2nd, Mayor of Albany, New York
Tom Cotton, US Senator
Alan "Ace" Cozzalio, US Army helicopter pilot
Dan Crenshaw, Former United States Navy SEAL officer serving as the United States representative for Texas's 2nd congressional district since 2019.
Robert E. Cushman Jr., 25th Commandant of the Marine Corps
Dieter Dengler, aviator and escaper
Ron DeSantis, Governor of Florida
Dale Dye, actor
Frank Sutton, actor
George Kennedy, actor
Jeremiah Denton, US Senator
Mark Esper, 27th US Secretary of Defense
Walter Fetterly, Colonel who led a rescue mission deep in enemy territory
Kenneth Raymond Fleenor, Mayor of Selma, Texas
Henry Fonda, actor
Maurice R. Greenberg, CEO of American International Group (AIG)
Eric Greitens, Governor of Missouri
Bob Gunton, actor
Michael Hagee, 33rd Commandant of the Marine Corps
Gil Hodges, Hall of Fame baseball player and manager 
Leo Hoegh, former Governor of Iowa
Daniel Inouye, US Senator
James L. Jones, 32nd Commandant of the Marine Corps, 22nd US National Security Advisor
Bob Kalsu, NFL football player
Otto Kerner Jr., Governor of Illinois
Bob Kerrey, US Senator
John Kerry, 68th US Secretary of State, senator of Massachusetts
Ben Key, Royal Navy Admiral
Kareem Rashad Sultan Khan, Muslim-American soldier
Charles C. Krulak, 31st Commandant of the Marine Corps 
Sharon Ann Lane, Army Nurse Corps
Eddie LeBaron, NFL football player
Douglas MacArthur, US General of the Army and Field Marshal of the Philippines
Jim Mattis, 26th US Secretary of Defense 
John McCain, US Senator
Ed Meads, NFL player
Charles Mergendahl, novelist, television writer
Glenn Miller, jazz musician
John U. Monro, Dean of Harvard College
Bud Moore, NASCAR team owner and crew chief, two Bronze Stars received
Hal Moore, Army General
Robert Neller, 37th Commandant of the Marine Corps
Peter Pace,  16th Chairman of the Joint Chiefs of Staff
Ferruccio Parri, leader of the Italian resistance movement
George S. Patton
David Petraeus, Director of the CIA
Colin Powell, 65th US Secretary of State, 12th Chairman of the Joint Chiefs of Staff
Geronimo Pratt, high-ranking member of the Black Panther Party, two Bronze Stars received
Tony Radakin, Royal Navy Admiral
Elliot Richardson, 11th US Secretary of Defense, 69th Attorney General, and Secretary of Commerce
Justus Rosenberg, member of the French Resistance, Commandeur de la Légion d'honneur, and Emeritus Professor of Languages and Literature
Jack Rudin, real estate developer
Rod Serling, writer/creator of The Twilight Zone
Raymond P. Shafer, Governor of Pennsylvania
Lloyd Stowell Shapley
Larry Siegel, writer
EJ Snyder, survivalist and television personality
Oliver Stone, director
Grace Thorpe, enviornmentalist and Native rights activist
Lee Van Cleef, actor
Richard Vinroot, Mayor of Charlotte, North Carolina
John Walsh, US Senator
Edward Warburg, philanthropist
Leroy H. Watson, Mayor of Beverly Hills, California
Douglas Wilder, Governor of Virginia
Elmo Zumwalt, 19th Chief of Naval Operations

References

Awards established in 1944
Courage awards
Military awards and decorations of the United States
Awards and decorations of the United States Air Force
Awards and decorations of the United States Army
Awards and decorations of the United States Coast Guard
Awards and decorations of the United States Marine Corps
Awards and decorations of the United States Navy
Awards and decorations of the United States Space Force